Carl R. Gray Jr. (April 14, 1889 – December 2, 1955) was an American United States Army general who served as the Administrator of Veterans Affairs from 1948 to 1953.

References

External links

Generals of World War II
 Uniform in Wisconsin Veteran's Museum

1889 births
1955 deaths
Military personnel from Kansas
People from Topeka, Kansas
United States Army personnel of World War I
United States Army generals of World War II
United States Army generals
United States Department of Veterans Affairs officials
University of Illinois alumni
Recipients of the Distinguished Service Medal (US Army)
Recipients of the Legion of Merit
Honorary Knights Commander of the Order of the British Empire